Darwin Harbour is the body of water close to Darwin in the Northern Territory of Australia. It opens to the north at a line from Charles Point in the west to Lee Point in the east into the Beagle Gulf and connects via the Clarence Strait with the Van Diemen Gulf. It contains Port Darwin, which is flanked by Frances Bay to the east and Cullen Bay to the west.

Name 
Darwin Harbour was named after the naturalist Charles Darwin, who sailed with captain Robert Fitzroy on the second expedition of the Beagle (December 1831 – October 1836) which visited parts of Australia. During the voyage, he became a friend of the officers, including John Lort Stokes and John Clements Wickham who were promoted for the next voyage of the ship.

Lieutenant Stokes was apparently the first British person to see Darwin harbour, when 's third expedition arrived there on 9 September 1839. The ship's captain, Commander Wickham, named the port after Darwin, having been reminded of his "geologising" by the new discovery there of a hitherto unknown fine-grained sandstone.

Climate 
The climate of the Darwin Harbour region is monsoon tropical with two distinct seasons: the Dry and the Wet. The Dry lasts for 6 months between April and September with an average rainfall of 24 mm, whereas the Wet lasts between October and March with an average monthly rainfall of 254 mm/month (according to the Bureau of Meteorology, 1999). The majority of the rain falls between December and April. Runoff varies between 250–1000 mm. Riverine discharge is relatively low with the exception of the Blackmore River and Elizabeth River. Peak flow for these rivers occurs in February, respectively 605Ml/day and 389 Ml/day, after which it slowly decreases until July when there is no freshwater input into Darwin Harbour until the onset of the following wet season (Padovan 1997). Cyclone frequency is low to moderate.

Marine life 
Darwin Harbour supports very high fish diversity with 415 fish species now known. Darwin Harbour provides a unique opportunity to see dugongs in the wild, because their
favourite food is located off Casuarina and Bundilla (formerly Vesteys) beaches. Seagrass meadows are also the main diet of green turtles and provide habitats for many smaller marine animals including commercially important species such as prawns and fish.

Oceanography

Currents 
The tides at Port Darwin are macro-tidal with a maximum tidal range of 7.8 m, a mean spring range of 5.5 m and a mean neap range of 1.9 m (Padovan, 1997). The currents caused by these tides are complex and strong.

Estuaries 

Darwin Harbour is a drowned river valley and consist of ria shorelines and extensive headlands.

Catchment

Geology  
The underlying lithology is dominated by Permian siltstones and sandstones.

Administrative status
On 4 April 2007, the remainder of Darwin Harbour which was not already part of a suburb or a locality within the boundaries of either of the two local government areas, the City of Darwin and the Litchfield Municipality, was gazetted by the Northern Territory Government as a locality with the name, Darwin Harbour. Its north-western boundary aligns with that of the boundary for the Port of Darwin which extends from Charles Point in the west to Lee Point in the east. The locality has not been added to any existing local government area and is considered to be part of the Northern Territory's unincorporated areas.

See also

List of ports in Australia

References

External links

Darwin, Northern Territory
Ports and harbours of the Northern Territory
Bays of the Northern Territory